Madame Tussauds India is a wax museum and tourist attraction It is the twenty-third location for the Tussauds, which was set up by French sculptor Marie Tussaud. Madame Tussauds is owned and operated by Merlin Entertainments. Now it has been shifted to Noida in July 2022.

On May 5, 2022 the attraction announced on its social media page that it will be opening soon at DLF Mall of India, Noida as Madame Tussauds India.

Wax Figures

Bollywood

Hollywood

Music

Sports

Television

Indian Leaders

See also 
Madame Tussauds
Marie Tussaud
Merlin Entertainments

References